Festuca frederikseniae is a species of grass native to Greenland, Newfoundland, Labrador, and to a few islands in eastern Québec (Mingan Archipelago and Anticosti Island). In Iceland and southern Greenland, a few populations have been found that may be hybrids between F. rubra and either F. frederikseniae or F. vivipara. The purported hybrids have been named F. x villosa-vivipara. All these species grow on cliffs and on rocky or sandy soils in alpine tundra.

Festuca frederikseniae is a caespitose herb forming tight clumps of plants up to 45 cm (18 inches) tall. Leaf blades are conduplicate (folded lengthwise). Inflorescence is up to 10 cm (4 inches) long with densely hairy spikelet bracts and fascicles.

References

frederikseniae
Flora of Greenland
Flora of Iceland
Flora of Quebec
Flora of Newfoundland
Flora of Labrador
Flora without expected TNC conservation status